Syfy Universal Asia (sometimes referred to as Syfy Asia) was an Asian cable television channel, launched on July 1, 2008 which mainly airs science fiction, fantasy and horror programs and movies. It also airs anime programming. It is owned by Universal Networks International.

The channel rebranded as Syfy Universal on July 26, 2010. On February 7, 2012, Syfy Universal's name was simplified to  Syfy as well as converting from 4:3 aspect ratio to 16:9 widescreen picture format since April 1, 2011. The channel delivers Same Day or Express from the U. S. telecast with selected programs.

After 9 years of broadcasting, Syfy along with Universal Channel officially ceased transmission at midnight, July 1, 2017 in the rest of the Asia and in Malaysia and Sri Lanka was discontinued a day earlier. The channel aired a final Syfy Original Movie, Summer Shark Attack on that day, ending with production credits before went off-the-air.

Operating channels
 Syfy Asia - SIN/HK/MY/PH/THAI/JKT feed; available on HD format in selected Asian countries apply.
 Syfy Taiwan - Same with the Asian feed but with Chinese subtitles; available in HD format.

Final Programming

Shows
 A Haunting
 Air
 Alphas
 Andromeda
 The Andromeda Strain
 Angel
 Attack of the Show!
 Babylon 5
 Battlestar Galactica
 Being Human
 Bionic Woman
 Black Lagoon
 Blade: The Series
 Continuum
 Dark Matter
 Dead Like Me
 The Dead Zone
 Defiance
 Destination Truth
 Dominion
 Ergo Proxy
 Escape Or Die!
 Eureka
 Face Off
 Fact or Faked: Paranormal Files
 Farscape
 Firefly
 First Wave
 Ghost Mine
 Ghost Whisperer
 Haibane Renmei
 Halcyon
 Haunted Case Files
 Haunted Collector
 Haunted Highway
 The Haunting Hour
 Haven
 Heroes of Cosplay
 Heroes
 Incorporated
 Jeremiah'
 Kyle XY' Legend of the Seeker Legend Quest Marcel's Quantum Kitchen Medium Merlin Mutant X The New Addams Family Nyan Koi! The Outer Limits Paranormal Survivor Paranormal Witness The Paranormal Zone Quantum Leap The R.I.P. Files Riese: Kingdom Falling RocketJump: The Show Sanctuary Samurai Girl 
 Scariest Places on Earth Serial Experiments Lain Sliders Star Trek: The Next Generation Stargate Atlantis Stargate SG-1 Stargate Universe Smallville Stan Lee's Lucky Man Stranded Supernatural Supernatural: The Animation Town of the Living Dead Tru Calling The Twilight Zone Warehouse 13 Web Soup Xena: Warrior Princess Z NationSyfy KidsBack to the FutureMatt Hatter ChroniclesThe Future Is WildThe MumyZ-SquadZuzu & the SupernuffsMovie block
 Mockbuster Mayhem Syfy Movies''

See also
 Syfy Universal in various countries
 SF Channel

References

External links
 

Syfy
Science fiction television channels
Television stations in Hong Kong
Mass media in Southeast Asia
Television channels and stations established in 2008
Television channels and stations disestablished in 2017